Copadichromis pleurostigmoides is a species of haplochromine cichlid which is endemic to Lake Malawi. It is found throughout the lake in Malawi, Mozambique, and Tanzania. This species is found inshore in both rocky and sandy areas.

References

pleurostigmoides
Fish described in 1960
Taxa named by Thomas Derrick Iles
Taxonomy articles created by Polbot